The Union for the Republic and Democracy (French: Union pour la République et la Démocratie, URD) is a political party in Mali, led by Soumaïla Cissé.

History
The party was formed by those who supported Soumaïla Cissé during the 2002 election. Most of its members came from ADEMA, the former ruling party. It is believed they felt betrayed by outgoing President Alpha Oumar Konaré, who supported Amadou Toumani Touré (eventual winner of the 2002 presidential election) against his own party. The MCCDR of Boubacar Karamoko Coulibaly and the PMDR of Abdoul Wahab Berthe joined the URD. Both men are vice-presidents of the URD.

The party placed second in the 2004 municipal elections and had 17 members in the National Assembly, including prominent members such as Mamadou Awa Gassama Diaby of Yelimane and Baba Oumar Bore of Kita. The party had 114 mayors in Mali including Ali Farka Touré of Niafunke and Demba Fane of the fifth district of Bamako.

The URD backed Amadou Toumani Touré for re-election in the April 2007 presidential election. The party, part of the pro-Touré Alliance for Democracy and Progress (ADP), won 34 out of 147 seats in the July 2007 parliamentary election.

At the URD's Third Ordinary Congress in November 2014, Soumaïla Cissé succeeded Younoussi Touré as President of the URD. Touré was instead designated as Honorary President. Following May 2020 the party won 17 seats out of 147 in the National Assembly of Mali, which makes it the third largest political party.

See also
Politics of Mali

References

External links
 Africa Political parties
 Mali on the CIA World Factbook

Political parties in Mali